Rebecca Donner is a Canadian-born writer. She is the author of All the Frequent Troubles of Our Days, which won the 2022 National Book Critics Circle Award for Biography, the PEN/Jacqueline Bograd Weld Award for Biography, and The Chautauqua Prize.

Biography 
Donner was born in Canada, and during childhood lived in Japan, Michigan, Virginia, and California. She received her BA from the University of California, Berkeley and MFA from Columbia University. She taught writing at Wesleyan University. She wrote “Sunset Terrace,” a novel set in Los Angeles, followed by “Burnout,” a graphic novel about ecoterrorism.

In 2021, Donner published a biography, All the Frequent Troubles of Our Days, of her great-great-aunt, Mildred Harnack, an American who was part of the Nazi resistance in Germany and was executed in 1943 on Hitler's orders. The book won the National Book Critics Circle Award for Biography, the PEN/Jacqueline Bograd Weld Award for Biography, and The Chautauqua Prize All the Frequent Troubles of Our Days was also a finalist for the Plutarch Award and the Los Angeles Times Book Prize, and a shortlisted nominee for the Governor General's Award for English-language non-fiction at the 2022 Governor General's Awards.

Donner received a 2022 Guggenheim Fellowship in the general nonfiction category. Donner is currently a 2023 Visiting Scholar at Oxford.

Works

References 

Living people
University of California, Berkeley alumni
Columbia University School of the Arts alumni
21st-century Canadian non-fiction writers
Canadian women non-fiction writers
Canadian biographers
Year of birth missing (living people)
21st-century Canadian women writers